Himatnagar is one of the 182 Legislative Assembly constituencies of Gujarat state in India. It is part of Sabarkantha district. It is numbered as 27-Himatnagar.

List of segments
This assembly seat represents the following segments,

 Himatnagar Taluka
 Bhiloda Taluka (Part) Villages – Nankhi, Khapreta, Fatepur, Medi Timba, Naroda, Mankdi, Shangal, Bamna, Siholi, Punasan, Dhuleta, Vantdi, Hathrol, Nani Bebar, Rajendranagar.
Talod Taluka (Part) Village – Charanvanta.

Members of Legislative Assembly

Election results

2022

2017

2014 by-election

2012

See also
 List of constituencies of the Gujarat Legislative Assembly
 Sabarkantha district

References

External links
 

Assembly constituencies of Gujarat
Sabarkantha district